Amanda Louise Rishworth (born 10 July 1978) is an Australian politician who has served as the Australian Labor Party member for the House of Representatives seat of Kingston in South Australia since the 2007 election. Rishworth was appointed Minister for Social Services in the Albanese ministry.

Early years
Rishworth was born in Adelaide at Flinders Medical Centre to Judith and Leslie, and has two siblings, Julian and Shannon. She attended Unley High School and was a retail worker and swimming instructor while also doing volunteer surf lifesaving duties at Seacliff. She later worked as an organiser and trainer for the Shop Distributive and Allied Employees Association (SDA) and was president of Australian Young Labor in 2000.

Rishworth studied psychology at Flinders University where she was president of the students' union before furthering her studies at Adelaide University with a master's degree in clinical psychology. She then became a practising psychologist in 2005 working in the delivery of mental health care to the community.

Political career
Rishworth was a Labor candidate at the 2006 state election for the electoral district of Fisher, where she was defeated by sitting independent Bob Such. Labor received a 59.4 per cent two-party-preferred vote from a 15.1-point swing against the Liberals, marking the first time since the 1985 state election that Labor won the two-party-preferred vote in Fisher.

In November 2006 Rishworth was preselected unopposed to contest the seat of Kingston at the 2007 federal election. She was up against the sitting Coalition member Kym Richardson who held the most marginal seat for his party after winning it at the 2004 federal election by just 119 votes. Two opinion polls conducted throughout the year by The Advertiser had a swing to Rishworth of up to 7 per cent. Key issues she concentrated on included the lack of broadband access in the electorate, as well as the shortage of doctors. During a debate on industrial relations centring on the Howard Government's controversial WorkChoices legislation, Rishworth was forced to debate minister Joe Hockey after Richardson pulled out with a prior commitment. Once the election campaign began local announcements included a $12.5 million GP Super Clinic and a $7 million upgrade to the South Road and Victor Harbor Road intersection. A poll midway through the campaign had Rishworth with a similar lead over Richardson to earlier opinion polls and on election day she ended up defeating him with a 54.4 per cent two-party-preferred vote from a 4.5-point swing, one of the seats that took the party from opposition to government after nearly 12 years.

Government
Rishworth gave her first speech to the House of Representatives in February 2008. She spoke of the time when she was a retail worker at Toys "R" Us during her teenage years and was offered an Australian workplace agreement (AWA) as a result of new laws introduced by the Howard government, which she refused to sign and as a result was put out of work.

Rishworth's work in the parliament included being a member of the health and ageing, communications as well as the industry, science and innovation committees.

In September 2008, Rishworth introduced a private member's bill in the parliament calling for a new agreement between the Australian and British governments concerning the need to index the British pension in Australia.

In February 2010, Rishworth again introduced a private member's bill into parliament, this time calling for a new code of conduct for the media industry to moderate the rapid growth of sexualisation in video clips, magazines, clothes and the internet.

At the 2010 federal election, Rishworth's Liberal party opponent was Chris Zanker, a chief inspector with the South Australian Police who was preselected a month before the election was called. During the campaign, Rishworth focussed on her record with construction underway on the GP super clinic as well as securing funds for an extension of the Noarlunga railway line to Seaford. A poll by The Advertiser showed a 12-point swing to her, with some suggesting this was in part due to new prime minister Julia Gillard having grown up in the Adelaide area. She was later re-elected with a 63.9 per cent two-party vote from a 9.5-point two-party swing, the largest margin of any party in Kingston's history, and the highest swing of any 2010 Labor candidate in the country, an election where the party suffered a 2.6-point swing against it nationally. In one stroke, she turned Kingston from the most marginal Labor seat in South Australia into the second-safest (behind only Port Adelaide).

On 11 March 2011, Rishworth and four other Australian parliamentarians were stuck on a bullet train heading from Kyoto to Tokyo for around five hours because of the Tōhoku earthquake and tsunami. They were in Japan on a young leaders exchange.

Rishworth was chair of the House of Representatives standing committee on education and employment as well as being a member of the Joint Standing electoral matters and Joint Select cyber-safety committees. She was also part of the Speaker's panel and was promoted to Parliamentary Secretary for Sustainability and Urban Water along with Disabilities and Carers in March 2013.

Opposition

Rishworth retained her seat of Kingston at the 2013 election with a 59.7 per cent two-party vote from a 4.9-point swing, then the second-largest margin of any party in Kingston's history. Labor, however, lost government, making Rishworth only the fourth opposition MP in the seat's history.  She was subsequently named Shadow Parliamentary Secretary for Health in the Shorten Shadow Ministry. On 24 June 2014, she was promoted to the Shadow outer ministry as Shadow Assistant Minister for Education.

She again retained her seat at the 2016 election with a 67 per cent two-party vote from a 7.3-point swing, the largest margin of any party in Kingston's history. Though Kingston remained Labor's second-safest South Australian seat behind Port Adelaide, Rishworth's primary vote of 49.4 per cent was the highest any candidate received throughout the eleven South Australian seats. Though Labor picked up a two-party swing in all eleven seats, the presence of Nick Xenophon Team candidates in all eleven seats produced, apart from a suppressed major party primary vote, a result where Rishworth was the only major party candidate in the state to pick up a primary vote swing.

Following the 2016 election, Rishworth was named Shadow Minister for Veterans' Affairs and Shadow Minister for Defence Personnel. In late 2017 Rishworth was also named Shadow Minister for Early Childhood Education and Development and was promoted to Shadow Cabinet.

Government (2022-)
Rishworth MP was sworn in as Minister for Social Services on 1 June 2022.

Positions 
Rishworth is a member of Labor Right.

Rishworth supports same-sex marriage having voted in support of a bill in Federal Parliament in 2012 and 2017.

Personal life
Rishworth married Timothy Walker in January 2013 and they have two sons, Percy and Oscar. She lives in the Kingston electorate at Hallett Cove and continues to be a volunteer surf lifesaver at Christies Beach.

References

External links
Rishworth.com.au official website
Parliamentary Profile: Australian Parliament website
Parliamentary Profile: Labor website

|-

 

Living people
1978 births
Australian Labor Party members of the Parliament of Australia
Labor Right politicians
Members of the Australian House of Representatives
Members of the Australian House of Representatives for Kingston
Women members of the Australian House of Representatives
Flinders University alumni
Politicians from Adelaide
21st-century Australian politicians
21st-century Australian women politicians
Albanese Government